Cyprinus megalophthalmus is a species of ray-finned fish in the genus Cyprinus that is endemic to Lake Erhai in China. There have been no records since the 1980s and it is possibly extinct.

References

Cyprinus
Fish described in 1963